Nogometni Klub Istra, commonly referred to as NK Istra or simply Istra, is a Croatian football club, from the city of Pula. The club currently plays in the fifth level of the Croatian league system but Istra has also played in the Prva HNL (1991–1997 and 1999–2000).

Istra was found in 1961 from a merger of NK Pula and NK Uljanik.

Honours 

 Treća HNL - West:
Winners (1): 2004–05

Recent seasons

External links
 

NK Istra
Association football clubs established in 1961
Football clubs in Croatia
Football clubs in Istria County
Football clubs in Yugoslavia
Sport in Pula
1961 establishments in Croatia